The 2011-12 season saw Glasgow Warriors compete in the competitions: the RaboDirect Pro12 and the European Champions Cup, the Heineken Cup.

Season Overview

Team

Coaches

Squad

Academy players

  George Hunter - Prop
  Rob McAlpine - Lock
  Adam Ashe - Flanker
  Callum Templeton - Number Eight

  Murray McConnell - Scrum-half
  Sean Kennedy - Scrum-half
  James Johnstone - Centre
  Mike Doneghan - Wing
  Rory Hughes - Wing

Player statistics

During the 2011–12 season, Glasgow have used 43 different players in competitive games. The table below shows the number of appearances and points scored by each player.

Staff movements

Coaches

Personnel In

Personnel Out

Player movements

Academy promotions

Player transfers

In

 Tommy Seymour from  Ulster
 Michael Cusack from  Doncaster Knights

Out

Competitions

Pre-season and friendlies

Match 1

Glasgow Warriors: 15 Peter Murchie; 14 Tommy Seymour, 13 Rob Dewey (Captain), 12 Troy Nathan, 11 Colin Shaw; 10 Scott Wight, 9 Henry Pyrgos; 1 Gordon Reid, 2 Pat MacArthur, 3 Ed Kalman, 4 Tom Ryder, 5 Nick Campbell, 6 James Eddie, 7 Chris Fusaro, 8 Ryan Wilson
Replacements: Finlay Gillies (for MacArthur, 62mins), Ryan Grant (for Reid, 20mins), Jon Welsh (for Grant, 50mins), Rob Harley (for Eddie, 29mins), Ross Doneghan (for Harley, 73mins), Rory Pitman (for Wilson, HT), Sean Kennedy (for Pyrgos, 73mins), Duncan Weir (for Wight, HT), Peter Horne (for Nathan, 50mins), Alex Dunbar (for Dewey, 50mins), Dave McCall (for Seymour, 56mins), Stuart Hogg (for Murchie, 32mins),

Newcastle Falcons: 15 Alex Tait; 14 Rikki Sheriffe, 13 Luke Eves, 12 Jamie Helleur, 11 Ryan Shortland; 10 Greg Goosen, 9 Jordi Pasqualin; 1 Grant Shiells, 2 Matt Thompson, 3 Ashley Wells, 4 Glen Townson, 5 Tim Swinson, 6 Will Welch, 7 Redford Pennycook, 8 Ally Hogg
Replacements: Darren Fearn, Joe Graham, Dan Frazier, Richard Boyle, Mark Wilson, Joe Robinson, Richard Mayhew, Will Chudley, Joel Hodgson, James Fitzpatrick, Chris Pilgrim, Luke Fielden

Match 2

Sale Sharks: 15. Rob Miller, 14. Tom Brady, 13. Andrew Higgins, 12. Luther Burrell, 11. Joaquin Tuculet, 10. Nick Macleod, 9. Dwayne Peel, 1. Tony Buckley, 2. Joe Ward, 3. Henry Thomas, 4. Kearnan Myall, 5. Fraser McKenzie, 6. James Gaskell, 7. David Seymour (capt.), 8. Mark Easter.

Replacements: 16. Marc Jones, 17. Lee Imiolek, 18. Vadim Cobilas, 19. Tommy Taylor, 20. Neil Briggs, 21. Scott Mathie, 22. Charlie Amesbury, 23. Kyle Tonetti, 24. Aston Croall, 25. Jordan Davies, 26. Tom Holmes.

Glasgow Warriors: 15 Stuart Hogg, 14 Federico Martín Aramburú, 13 Peter Horne, 12 Troy Nathan, 11 Dave McCall, 10 Duncan Weir, 9 Henry Pyrgos, 1 Ryan Grant, 2 Pat MacArthur, 3 Mike Cusack, 4 Tom Ryder, 5 Nick Campbell, 6 Rob Harley (capt.), 7 Chris Fusaro, 8 Rory Pitman.

Replacements: 16 Finlay Gillies, 17 Ed Kalman, 18 Jon Welsh, 19 Gordon Reid, 20 Colin Gregor, 21 Scott Wight, 22 Tommy Seymour, 23 Colin Shaw. Other substitutes: James Eddie, Ryan Wilson, Rob Dewey.

European Champions Cup

Pool 3

Results

Round 1

Round 2

Round 3

Round 4

Round 5

Round 6

RaboDirect Pro12

League table

Results

Round 1

Round 2

Round 3

Round 4

Round 5

Round 6

Round 7

Round 8

Round 9

Round 10

Round 11: 1872 Cup (1st Leg)

Round 12: 1872 Cup (2nd Leg)

Glasgow Warriors won the 1872 Cup with an aggregate score of 40 - 35.

Round 13

Round 14

Round 15

Round 16

Round 17

Round 18

Round 19

Round 20

Round 21

Round 22

Playoffs

Semi-finals

End of Season awards

Competitive debuts this season

A player's nationality shown is taken from the nationality at the highest honour for the national side obtained; or if never capped internationally their place of birth. Senior caps take precedence over junior caps or place of birth; junior caps take precedence over place of birth. A player's nationality at debut may be different from the nationality shown. Combination sides like the British and Irish Lions or Pacific Islanders are not national sides, or nationalities.

Players in BOLD font have been capped by their senior international XV side as nationality shown.

Players in Italic font have capped either by their international 7s side; or by the international XV 'A' side as nationality shown.

Players in normal font have not been capped at senior level.

A position in parentheses indicates that the player debuted as a substitute. A player may have made a prior debut for Glasgow Warriors in a non-competitive match, 'A' match or 7s match; these matches are not listed.

Tournaments where competitive debut made:

Crosshatching indicates a jointly hosted match.

Sponsorship

Official Kit Supplier

Canterbury - Official Kit Supplier

References

2011-12
2011–12 in Scottish rugby union
2011–12 Pro12 by team
2011–12 Heineken Cup by team